Jordan Desalination Plant is a planned sea water desalination plant in the city of  Aqaba in Jordan. The facility is under development by the government of Jordan, with the aim of narrowing the water deficit in the country. Bids for the engineering, procurement and construction (EPC) contract were advertised. In June 2021, thirteen international consortia responded and five of them were shortlisted to advance to the next bidding stage. Construction of the desalination plant is budgeted at approximately US$1 billion and is expected to take approximately five years.

Location
The desalination plant would be located in the sea-side city of Aqaba, in Aqaba Governorate, on the shores of the Gulf of Aqaba, a part of the Red Sea, in extreme southern Jordan.

Overview
The Kingdom of Jordan, with a population of 10 million people, is one of the world's most water-stressed countries. However, at that time only  was available. The shortage was attributed to poor rains, climate change, a ballooning population and a high refugee influx.

To mitigate its water shortfall, the Jordanian government opened a desalination plant in 2017. The plant is referred to as the Aqaba Desalination Plant. The facility produces  of potable water annually, that is distributed to homes, industry and agriculture in the Aqaba area. At that time a bigger project, the Red Sea to Dead Sea Water Canal (RSDSWC), a collaborative effort between Israel, Jordan and the Palestinian Authority was in the plans.

In June 2021, after years of delay and lack of commitment from the other stakeholders, the Jordanian government abandoned the RSDSWC project and focused on this desalination plant project. Essentially, sea water will be extracted from the Red Sea and conveyed via intake pipelines to a desalination plant in Aqaba. The purified water will be pumped via pipeline to Amman and points north. The effluent brine will also be piped north via discharge pipeline and deposited into the Dead Sea, whose levels have been falling in recent years.

Other considerations
The brine pumped into the Dead Sea is expected to support a hydroelectric power station, with the installation of electric generators in its path.

Until this desalination plant reaches commercial commissioning, Jordan continues to purchase  of potable water annually, from Israel, under previous peace accords between the two countries.

See also
 Desalination
 Water supply and sanitation in Jordan
 Mamelles Desalination Plant

References

External links
 Approximate Location of Jordan Desalination Plant

Buildings and structures in Jordan
Aqaba
Water resources management
Water in Jordan